49th Parallel is a 1941 British and Canadian war drama film. It was the third film made by the British filmmaking team of Michael Powell and Emeric Pressburger. It was released in the United States as The Invaders. The British Ministry of Information approached Michael Powell to make a propaganda film for them, suggesting he make "a film about mine-sweeping". Instead, Powell decided to make a film to help sway opinion in the then-neutral United States. Said Powell, "I hoped it might scare the pants off the Americans" and thus bring them into the war. Screenwriter Emeric Pressburger remarked, "Goebbels considered himself an expert on propaganda, but I thought I'd show him a thing or two". Powell persuaded the British and Canadian governments and started location filming in 1940, but by the time the film appeared, in March 1942, the United States, which had been trying to stay out of the war in Europe, had been drawn into taking sides against Germany.

The original choice to play the German officer, Lieutenant Hirth, was their production company's stalwart Esmond Knight. Knight had become involved in training Local Defence Volunteers (better remembered as the Home Guard) after the evacuation of Dunkirk and, in late 1940, he was accepted for training with the Royal Navy. That training would have conflicted with work on 49th Parallel.

Anton Walbrook as "Peter" donated half his fee to the International Red Cross. Raymond Massey, Laurence Olivier and Leslie Howard all agreed to work at half their normal fee, because they felt it was an important propaganda film. TCM's Rob Nixon observes that "One of the reasons for the movie's high quality is the superb ensemble cast, most of them major British stars working for drastically reduced wages because they believed in the film".

This is the only time that Canadian-born Massey played a Canadian on screen.

Plot
In the Gulf of St. Lawrence, U-37, a German U-boat, sinks a Canadian freighter, then evades the RCN and RCAF by sailing into Hudson Bay. While a raiding party of six is ashore in search of food and fuel, the U-boat is sunk by RCAF bombers. The six survivors set out for the neutral United States, led by Lieutenants Hirth and Kuhnecke.

When a floatplane is dispatched to investigate reports of the sinking, the Germans open fire, killing the pilot and some of the local Inuit. They steal the aircraft, but cannot achieve takeoff because they are overloaded. One sailor steps out onto a float to throw out the guns and is shot and killed by a member of the Inuit, thereby lightening the load for take-off.

Heading south, the floatplane runs out of fuel and crashes in a lake in Manitoba, killing Kuhnecke. The Germans are welcomed to a nearby Hutterite farming community. The fugitives assume that the Hutterites are sympathetic to the Nazi cause, but some of them are refugees from Hitler's Germany, and Hirth's fanatical speech is eloquently refuted by Peter, the community's leader. One of the sailors, Vogel, would rather join the community and ply his trade as a baker, but he is tried by Hirth and summarily executed for desertion and treachery.

Hirth, Lohrmann and Kranz arrive in Winnipeg. Hirth decides they will travel west to Vancouver and catch a steamship for Japan. They hijack a car, then take a train that stops in Banff, Alberta, during Banff Indian Days. A Canadian Mountie addresses the crowd and Kranz is arrested when he panics.

Fleeing across the Rocky Mountains, the two remaining men are welcomed to a lakeside camp by an eccentric English writer named Philip Armstrong Scott, who takes them for lost tourists. They turn on him, burning his manuscript and his precious paintings. Scott and his men pursue them. Lohrmann finally rebels against Hirth's leadership and takes off by himself. Lohrmann is cornered in a cave. Scott is wounded, but enters the cave and beats Lohrmann unconscious.

Hirth, the last fugitive, meets Andy Brock, a Canadian soldier who is absent without leave, in the baggage car of a Canadian National Railway train near the Canadian-US border. Hirth knocks Brock cold with the butt of his gun and steals his uniform and dog tags. After the train crosses into the United States at Niagara Falls, Hirth surrenders his gun to a U.S. Customs official and demands to be taken to the German embassy. Brock explains that Hirth, now world famous, is wanted in Canada for murder, and points out that neither of them is listed on the freight manifest. The Americans send Hirth and Brock back to Canada. As the train returns over the bridge, Brock dons his uniform cap, tells Hirth to put his hands up, and  a solid punch is heard.

Cast
The U-boat crew
 Richard George as Kommandant Bernsdorff
 Eric Portman as Lieutenant Hirth
 Raymond Lovell as Lieutenant Kuhnecke
 Niall MacGinnis as Vogel
 Peter Moore as Kranz
 John Chandos as Lohrmann
 Basil Appleby as Jahner

The Canadians
 Laurence Olivier as Johnnie, the trapper
 Finlay Currie as the factor
 Ley On as Nick, the Eskimo
 Anton Walbrook as Peter
 Glynis Johns as Anna
 Charles Victor as Andreas
 Frederick Piper as David
 Leslie Howard as Philip Armstrong Scott
 Tawera Moana as George, the Indian
 Eric Clavering as Art
 Charles Rolfe as Bob
 Raymond Massey as Andy Brock
 Theodore Salt and O.W. Fonger as the United States Customs officers

Production
The opening credits and dedication appear over an aerial panorama of the Canadian Rockies. The opening shot reads:This film is dedicated to Canada and to Canadians all over the Dominion who helped us to make it; to the Governments of the USA, of the Dominion of Canada, and of the United Kingdom, who made it possible, and to the actors who believed in our story and came from all parts of the world to play in it.Powell's interest in making a propaganda film set in Canada to aid the British war effort dovetailed with some of Pressburger's work. Although only a concept during pre-production, a screenplay began to be formulated based on Pressburger's idea to replicate the Ten Little Indians scenario of people being removed from a group, one by one. While Powell and Pressburger developed the screenplay, additional photography was assembled of the scope and breadth of Canada. All the opening "travelogue" footage was shot by Freddie Young with a hand-held camera out the windows of various aircraft, trains and automobiles on an initial trip across Canada.

The U-boat was built by Harry Roper of Halifax, Nova Scotia and towed to Corner Brook, Newfoundland, where it was "shot down" by the Royal Canadian Air Force (RCAF) Lockheed Hudson bombers in the Strait of Belle Isle at the beginning of the film. Powell forgot that Newfoundland was at the time a Crown Colony, not a part of Canada. As a result, when they moved the full-sized submarine model there, it was impounded by Customs & Excise, which demanded that import duty be paid. Powell had to appeal to the Governor of Newfoundland, citing the film's contribution to the war effort.

The "U-37" carried two 1,000 lb bombs supplied by the RCAF. Powell did not tell the actors that they were aboard, as he thought that they might become nervous. The actors were replaced by dummies before the bombs were detonated. Powell's voice can be heard faintly in some of the submarine scenes. Once, when the camera boat almost collides with the submarine, Powell says, "Keep rolling." The men in the lifeboat at the start of the film were mainly local merchant seamen, many of whom had already been torpedoed.

One of the camera grips, Canadian teenager William Leslie Falardeau, also played an aviator on the rescue floatplane as it arrived at Cape Wolstenholme. In the film, he was shot and apparently killed by the Nazis before they commandeered the aircraft. A second role for him was as a double for Raymond Massey in a few scenes. Before the film was released, Falardeau became an RCAF pilot and was killed at age 19 in an aircraft accident in Britain.

Lovell nearly drowned in the scene where the commandeered floatplane crashes. Even those who could swim (which Lovell could not) became flustered when the aircraft sank faster than anticipated; the stink bomb that was thrown in to "heighten the turmoil" added greatly to the chaos. A member of the camera crew jumped in and saved the actor.

The Hutterites near Winnipeg allowed the film company into their community. Like the better known Amish, they live in simple, self-sufficient communities, leading an austere, strict lifestyle. Elisabeth Bergner was originally cast in the role of Anna. When a Hutterite woman saw Bergner painting her nails and smoking, she became so incensed that she rushed up, knocked the cigarette from the actress's mouth and slapped her in the face. Powell had to make peace with the community and with the outraged star. Bergner later deserted the film, refusing to come back to Britain for the studio scenes. It is believed that, as an ex-German national, she feared for her life if the Nazis were to invade. Glynis Johns, then little-known and at the beginning of her film career, stepped in to replace Bergner. However, many on-location wide shots in which Bergner appeared were salvaged for the film; Powell joked that this would be a rare instance of an established star standing in for a lesser-known actress. The initial long shots of Anna are of Bergner. For the scene where the Hutterites listen to Eric Portman's impassioned pro-Nazi speech, the actors were all "hand picked faces". Over half were refugees from Hitler.

Notable crew members included Freddie Young as director of photography, David Lean as editor. Raymond Massey's brother Vincent Massey, then Canadian High Commissioner to the United Kingdom and future Governor General, read the prologue.

Arthur Horman did a week's uncredited work on the script in Montreal, writing the Laurence Olivier and Raymond Massey sequences. He later wrote Desperate Journey, which has a similar story.

Ralph Vaughan Williams provided the stirring music, his first film score. It was directed by Muir Mathieson and performed by the London Symphony Orchestra. Along with the credits for the actors before the title at the beginning of the film, there is a credit for "The music of Ralph Vaughan Williams".

The film was meant to cost £68,000 but ended up costing £132,000 of which the government provided less than £60,000.

Ironically, Pressburger was still an "enemy alien” as far as the British government was concerned, and when he returned from Canada, he was imprisoned and threatened with deportation until Powell and the Ministry of Information intervened.

American release
The film was picked up by Columbia Pictures for a 1942 American release and retitled The Invaders. American censors cut 19 minutes from the film, including the speech by the fanatical Nazi commander who claims that Eskimos are "sub-apes like Negroes, only one step above the Jews", which was removed to avoid offending segregationists in the American South. The American film trailer was made on the set of the film The Talk of the Town, under the title It Happened One Noon, with stars Cary Grant, Jean Arthur and Ronald Colman telling the director George Stevens about seeing the exciting film during a two-hour lunch break.

Reception

Critics
Critics' reviews of 49th Parallel were generally favourable, with the New York Times reviewer effusing, "Tense action... excellent performances. An absorbing and exciting film!" and Variety concluding, "This is an important and effective film. Opening scenes promise much, and it lives up to expectations. Every part, to the smallest bits, is magnificently played...."

49th Parallel holds a 90% approval rating on Rotten Tomatoes, based on 10 reviews with an average rating of 7.1/10.

Leonard Maltin gives the film 3.5 out of 4 stars to this "Taut, exciting WW2 yarn.." and its  "...Top-notch cast, rich suspense and characterizations".

Box office
According to Kinematograph Weekly it was the most popular film at the British box office in 1941. The Times attributed the success of the film to the enthusiasm of Odeon Cinemas founder, Oscar Deutsch.

In the US, Universal turned the film down but it was bought by Columbia for distribution in North America for a reported $200,000. Variety estimated it earned $1.3 million in US rentals in 1942. The film ended up earning $5 million at the North American box office.

Awards
Pressburger won an Oscar for Best Story and the film was nominated for Best Picture and Best Screenplay (including Rodney Ackland for additional dialogue). Powell was nominated for Best Director by the New York Film Critics Circle.

The British Film Institute ranked the film the 63rd most popular film with British audiences, based on cinema attendance of 9.3 million in the UK.

References

Bibliography

External links
 
 
 
 
 63rd place in the British Film Institute's Ultimate Film Chart
 , with full synopsis and film stills (and clips viewable from UK libraries)
 Reviews and articles at the Powell & Pressburger Pages
 49th Parallel: The War Effort an essay by Charles Barr at the Criterion Collection

1941 films
1941 war films
1941 drama films
1940s English-language films
Anabaptism in popular culture
British World War II films
British war drama films
British World War II propaganda films
British black-and-white films
Films about Canada–United States relations
Films set in Alberta
Films set in Manitoba
Films set in Ontario
Films that won the Academy Award for Best Story
Films shot at Denham Film Studios
Films by Powell and Pressburger
Films scored by Ralph Vaughan Williams
Hutterites in Canada
Films directed by Michael Powell